Cocoon: The Return is a 1988 American science fiction comedy-drama film directed by Daniel Petrie and written by Stephen McPherson. The film serves as the sequel to the 1985 film Cocoon. All of the starring actors from the first film reprised their roles in this film, although Brian Dennehy only appears in one scene at the end of the film. Unlike its predecessor, the film was neither a commercial nor a critical success.

Plot
Five years after they left Earth following a failed rescue mission, the Antareans return to rescue the cocoons that were left behind. Before they can be retrieved, one of the cocoons is discovered by a science research team and taken to a secure laboratory for testing. The aliens and their human allies must find a way to retrieve the cocoon in time for their rendezvous with the rescue ship, while the humans travelling with them must decide whether to return to Antarea or stay on Earth and become mortal again.

Joe learns that his leukemia has returned, but he knows it will be cured again as soon as he and Alma leave Earth. When Alma is hit by a car while saving a child, Joe gives up the last of his lifeforce, saving her life but sacrificing his. Before dying, he tells Alma to accept a job offer at a preschool and that he loves her. Art and Bess learn that Bess is pregnant, and decide to raise the child on Antarea so they will live long enough to see him grow up. Ben and Mary reconnect with their family and friends, including Bernie who is shown to have found love with Ruby, alleviating his suicidal depression over Rose's death. And although a lovelorn Jack once again attempts to woo Kitty, she instead grants him a vision of his future, showing him children and a wife with a small heart-shaped birthmark on her neck.

The next night, before Ben, Mary, Art and Bess leave to meet the Antareans, Alma tells them she is staying on Earth to work at the preschool. Art, Kitty, Ben, and his grandson David (Barret Oliver) then rescue the Antarean from the Oceanographic Institute. Sara, one of the scientists working at the institute, becomes aware of the company's plans to hand the alien over to the military. Unhappy about this, when she discovers the rescuers, she allows them to escape.

After the four get the Antarean on Jack's boat out at sea, Ben makes it known to everyone that he and Mary were going to stay on Earth as well, since family was more important than living forever and that they should not outlive their children. When the space ship arrives, they are met by Walter before the Antareans, Art, Bess, and the cocoons left behind from the previous trip are brought aboard the space ship which departs for their homeworld.

Back at port after he has said his goodbyes to Ben, Mary, and David, Jack is approached by Sara asking if he knows of a place where she could get some gas. They walk and talk for a bit, where Sara tells him she just quit her job. He eventually notices the small heart-shaped birthmark on her neck.

Cast

 Don Ameche as Art Selwyn
 Wilford Brimley as Ben Luckett
 Courteney Cox as Sara
 Hume Cronyn as Joe Finley
 Jack Gilford as Bernie Lefkowitz
 Steve Guttenberg as Jack Bonner
 Barret Oliver as David
 Maureen Stapleton as Mary Luckett
 Jessica Tandy as Alma Finley
 Gwen Verdon as Bess McCarthy-Selwyn
 Tahnee Welch as Kitty
 Elaine Stritch as Ruby Feinberg
 Linda Harrison as Susan
 Tyrone Power Jr. as Pillsbury
 Mike Nomad as Doc
 Herta Ware (cameo) as Rose Lefkowitz
 Brian Dennehy (cameo) as Walter. Dennehy held out on returning as alien leader "Walter" but finally agreed to a 3-minute scene at the film's end. He accepted no salary and appeared only as a favor to his castmates from the first film.

Soundtrack

The score to Cocoon: The Return was composed and conducted by James Horner who had scored Cocoon.  The score mostly consisted of recycled themes and material from the first film.  The soundtrack was released on 23 November 1988 through Varèse Sarabande and features nine tracks of score at a running time of just over fifty-three minutes.

 "Returning Home" (6:05)
 "Taking Bernie to the Beach" (4:31)
 "Joe's Gift" (8:06)
 "Remembrances/The Break-In" (8:24)
 "Basketball Swing" (6:58)
 "Jack's Future" (2:44)
 "Growing Old" (1:55)
 "Good Friend" (3:16)
 "Rescue/The Ascension" (11:29)

Reception
The film had a generally negative reception. Roger Ebert of the Chicago Sun-Times gave the film two and a half out of four stars saying "Yes, the performances are wonderful, and, yes, it's great to see these characters back again. But that's about it. For someone who has seen Cocoon, the sequel gives you the opportunity to see everybody saying goodbye for the second time." On Rotten Tomatoes, a review aggregator, the film has an approval rating of 31% based on 13 reviews; the average rating is 4.50/10. On Metacritic, the film has a score of 45 out of 100 based on 13 critics, indicating "mixed or average reviews". Audiences polled by CinemaScore gave the film an average grade of "B+" on an A+ to F scale.

The film brought $25 million worldwide, far less than the first film's $85 million worldwide gross.

Then-U.S. President Ronald Reagan viewed this film at Camp David on November 12, 1988.

Awards and nominations

References

External links

 
 
 

1988 films
1980s science fiction films
20th Century Fox films
American sequel films
1980s English-language films
American science fiction films
Films directed by Daniel Petrie
Films scored by James Horner
Films about health care
Films produced by David Brown
Films produced by Richard D. Zanuck
Films shot in Florida
The Zanuck Company films
1980s American films